Mastery Charter School - Smedley Elementary is a charter school located in the Frankford neighborhood of Philadelphia, Pennsylvania. Originally called Franklin Smedley School, the school has been run by Mastery Charter Schools since 2010. The building was designed by Irwin T. Catharine and built in 1927–1928.  It is a three-story, nine-bay, yellow brick building on a raised basement in the Late Gothic Revival style. It features a projecting stone entryway with Tudor-arched opening, stone openings, and a crenellated parapet.

The building was added to the National Register of Historic Places in 1988.

References

External links

School buildings on the National Register of Historic Places in Philadelphia
Gothic Revival architecture in Pennsylvania
School buildings completed in 1928
Frankford, Philadelphia
Public elementary schools in Philadelphia
Charter schools in Pennsylvania
1928 establishments in Pennsylvania